The Buick Verano (Chinese: 威朗) is a compact car manufactured by SAIC-GM for the GM's Buick brand since 2010. It debuted at the North American International Auto Show on January 10, 2011, during a preview of Buick's then upcoming 2012 model.
It is the first compact marketed by Buick in the United States since the 1998 Buick Skylark.  Verano is Spanish for summer.

The Verano, the Buick Excelle GT, which was developed for the Chinese market, and the Opel Astra/Vauxhall Astra sedan share General Motors' Delta II platform with the Chevrolet Cruze, Chevrolet Orlando, and Opel/Vauxhall Zafira Tourer. In the US, it was manufactured by General Motors from 2012 to 2017.


First generation (2011) 

Jim Federico, Executive Director and Vehicle Chief Engineer for Verano, led the vehicle development team and David Lyon, Buick design director, styled the exterior.

The Verano is essentially a North American-market version of the Chinese-market compact Buick Excelle GT. The Verano's unibody construction uses galvanized steel for its front fenders, hood, roof and door panels and thermoplastic polyolefin (TPO) bumper covers. It incorporates acoustical laminated glass, triple door seals, a five-layer interior roof liner, sound absorbing mats, recycled denim insulation and specially manufactured 18-inch forged alloy wheels, which minimize road noise. Buick's VentiPorts reappeared at the Verano's introduction, a styling feature unique to Buick dating back to 1949.

The standard powertrain is a 2.4 L Ecotec direct-injected DOHC I4 mated to a six-speed automatic transmission. The engine is flex-fuel capable, meaning it can use either gasoline, or E85 ethanol (2012–13) • 2.4L, or any combination of the two fuels. EPA fuel economy estimates are  city and  highway for gasoline.

A 2.0 L turbocharged version became available in late 2012, for the 2013 model year, as did a 6-speed manual transmission.

For 2016, the Verano added a new Sport Touring Edition which included unique 18″ aluminum black pocket wheels and a rear lip spoiler.

The Verano was phased out from the US market after the 2017 model year. The second generation Verano is sold exclusively in China, leaving Buick without an entry-level sedan in the US market.

Engines 
{| class="wikitable"  style="text-align:center; font-size:91%; "
|-
!colspan="8"|Gasoline engine
|- style="background:#dcdcdc; text-align:center; vertical-align:middle;"
!Engine
!Displacement
!Power
!Torque
!Transmission
!Model Years
|- style="background:#fff;"
|- style="background:#fff;"
|2.4 L Ecotec I4 (Flex-Fuel)||2384 cc|| at 6700 rpm|| at 4900 rpm||6-speed automatic ||2012-
|-style="background:#fff;"
|2.0 L Ecotec t/c I4|| 1998 cc|| at 5300 rpm|| at 2000 rpm||6-speed automatic  6-speed manual (optional) ||2013-
|-style="background:#fff;"
|'1.6 L Family 1 t/c I4|| 1598 cc|| at 5800 rpm|| at 2200 - 5600 rpm||6-speed automatic ||2010-
|-
|}

 Second generation (2016) 

The second generation Verano was introduced on 27 July 2015 in the Chinese market. This generation of Verano is longer, lighter, more fuel efficient and has more interior space than its predecessor. It is sold in both sedan and hatchback body styles.

 Powertrain 
The 2.0T model is equipped with the GM Ecotec 1.5-litre Turbo SIDI engine mated to the 7-speed DCG dual-clutch transmission.

 Verano GS 

A performance GS variant based on the cancelled Opel Astra OPC debuted at the 2015 Guangzhou Auto Show on November 20, 2015, and went on sale in China at the end of the year. Unique aesthetic features include red accents and black chrome wheels.

 2018 facelift 

In late 2017, Buick updated the Verano with a revised grille. The update applies to the Buick Verano sedan, Verano hatchback, and Excelle GT sedan.  Buick added an Excelle GX station wagon to the lineup.

 Second facelift (2020) 
A more significant update to the second-generation Verano was launched in September 2019. Although Buick called it "all new", only the front and back of the exterior were changed, along with minor interior changes and new engine/transmission options.

 Engines 

 Third generation (Pro, 2021) 

The third generation Buick Verano was first leaked in late 2019, with the front and rear being very similar to the post-facelift second generation model and the A-pillars being pushed back. The actual production vehicle was officially launched during the 2021 Shanghai Autoshow during April 2021 as the Buick Verano Pro''', with the GS performance model being one of the first versions to be launched. The Buick Verano Pro was developed by PATAC of SAIC-GM.
It is powered by a new 1.5-litre turbocharged 4-cylinder engine, producing  and  torque.

Buick Verano Pro GS
Despite the previous GS trim being performance variants, the Buick Verano Pro GS remains to be an appearance package which includes darkened exterior touches and sportier looking front and rear bumpers.

Sales 

* Excelle GT sales include Excelle XT (hatchback) figures.
** Sales in the US began in November 2011.
*** 2015 Chinese sales include Excelle XT/GT, 2nd gen. Excelle GT and Verano figures.

References

External links

 

Verano
Compact cars
Front-wheel-drive vehicles
Motor vehicles manufactured in the United States
Sedans
Cars introduced in 2011
2010s cars